The 1996 Republican National Convention convened at the San Diego Convention Center (SDCC) in San Diego, California, from August 12 to August 15, 1996. The convention nominated former Senator Bob Dole from Kansas, for president and former Representative and secretary of Housing and Urban Development Jack Kemp, from suburban Buffalo, New York, for vice president.

Background

Political context

After a bitter primary, Dole had secured the Republican presidential nomination—but at high cost, financially and politically. The Party had lost momentum after President Bill Clinton successfully co-opted the historically Republican issues of crime and welfare reform and portrayed House Speaker Newt Gingrich as an extremist.

Within his own party, Dole was under pressure from both sides of the political spectrum. Social liberals such as California Governor Pete Wilson and Massachusetts Governor William Weld loudly argued to remove the Human Life Amendment plank from the convention platform. On the right, primary opponents Patrick Buchanan and Alan Keyes withheld endorsements—Buchanan staged a rally for his supporters in nearby Escondido on the eve of the San Diego convention. Indeed, past comments by Kemp labeling Dole as a tax-raiser surfaced. The long, bitter primary had also left the Dole campaign short of funds as a result of federal election spending limits in the months leading up to the convention.

The Dole campaign sought to use the convention to unite the party, to appeal to political moderates, and to highlight Dole's honorable service in World War II and in the U.S. Senate. Nearly all floor speeches were delivered by moderate or liberal Republicans, including the keynote address by New York Representative Susan Molinari, and Dole was nominated by fellow veteran and Arizona Senator John McCain. Gingrich, who less than two years earlier had been a star of the party, was denied a prime time slot altogether, as was Buchanan, who had finished in second place for the nomination, with over 200 delegates. However, supporters in the socially conservative grassroots organizations such as the Christian Coalition directed the convention to adopt a conservative platform with little controversy, and Buchanan released his delegates at the last minute.

The convention ran smoothly overall, and the Dole-Kemp team seemed to benefit in the short term. Opinion polls taken shortly after the conclusion of the convention showed the Republicans with a significant "bump" of increased support. However, this bump was extremely temporary, and they continued to trail the incumbent Clinton-Gore team; they went on to lose the election by almost nine points.

Site selection
The Republican National Committee asked 30 cities to submit bids. Their finalist cities were Chicago, New Orleans, New York City, San Antonio, and San Diego. Chicago withdrew their bid after winning their bid to host the 1996 Democratic National Convention. San Diego, ultimately, beat out the remaining finalists to win the RNC. The selection of San Diego was announced in January 1995.

The 1996 RNC was the first presidential nominating convention to be held in San Diego, and the only Republican National Convention held in Southern California. (The 1972 RNC was scheduled for the San Diego Sports Arena but relocated to Miami Beach, Florida, due to scandal.) Indeed, San Diego's bid had been considered unlikely to win. The SDCC was far smaller than its predecessor venues, the Astrodome in Houston and the Louisiana Superdome in New Orleans, and its normal seating layout left several sections and skyboxes with obstructed views. Ardent lobbying by Mayor Susan Golding, who some named as a potential candidate for U.S. Senate in 1998, and by Governor Wilson, himself to seek the 1996 presidential nomination, helped secure San Diego's selection in 1994.

Bids

Other bids
In mid-February 1994, Los Angeles, California withdrew its bid to have the Los Angeles Convention Center host the convention, citing the previous month's 1994 Northridge earthquake as the reason the city could not afford to finance such a gather in 1996.

In late-March 1994, St. Louis, Missouri withdrew its bid.

Logistics

The San Diego Host Committee, "Sail to Victory '96," was organized on September 8, 1995.

This was the first national party convention since the 1995 Oklahoma City bombing, which sparked heightened concerns over terrorism. The possibility that the explosion of TWA Flight 800 weeks before was a terrorist incident also weighed on convention planners. The Convention Center was located on the waterfront, near a harbor frequented by thousands of small boats—upon one of which Dole and Kemp made their ceremonial arrival. The police, Coast Guard, and other security presence was massive.

Convention planners situated the designated protest area several blocks away from the convention center, sparking criticism and legal action. It was later moved to a parking lot closer to the building which had originally been designated as an ADA-compliant transportation hub.

The convention was successful for San Diego, bringing positive publicity to the city and its revitalized waterfront and Gaslamp Quarter. The convention committee, however, overran its budget by some $20 million, largely because of the extra costs of security.

Convention speakers
John Marelius of the San Diego Union-Tribune described the convention's lineup of speakers as portraying a, "diverse, inclusive Republican Party of stirring orators, women, minorities, disabled people and Democrats who switched parties." Marelius regarded the convention as contrasting with the preceding 1992 Republican convention, which had given prominent platform for Pat Buchanan's "religious war". Some religious conservatives took issue with the sparse inclusion of "pro-life" (anti-abortion) rhetoric in the convention.

Schedule

August 12
Former President Gerald Ford
Former President George H. W. Bush
Retired General Colin Powell
Former First Lady Nancy Reagan

August 13
Representative John Kasich of Ohio
Representative J.C. Watts of Oklahoma
Senator Kay Bailey Hutchison of Texas
Governor Christine Todd Whitman of New Jersey
Representative Susan Molinari of New York (keynote address)

August 14
Former United States secretary of labor and United States secretary of transportation Elizabeth Dole (wife of presidential nominee Bob Dole)
Colorado Senator Ben Nighthorse Campbell
Former vice president Dan Quayle
Former United States ambassador to the United Nations Jeane Kirkpatrick
Former United States secretary of state James Baker III
Robin Dole (daughter of presidential nominee Bob Dole)

August 15
Stephen Fong
Vice presidential nominee and former United States secretary of housing and urban development Jack Kemp (vice presidential nomination acceptance speech)
Presidential nominee and former United States Senate majority leader Bob Dole (presidential nomination acceptance speech)

Notable speeches

Bob Dole's presidential nomination acceptance speech

Dole's acceptance speech provided a heavy focus on the issue of trust, highlighting not just the need for the American public to have trust in government, but also the need for the government to have trust in the American public. Dole declared, "the fundamental issue is not of policy, but of trust -- not merely whether the people trust the president, but whether the president and his party trust the people, trust in their goodness and their genius for recovery. For the government cannot direct the people, the people must direct the government."

In his speech, Dole denounced intolerance, including racism and religious intolerance. Dole declared the Republican to be, "broad and inclusive," claiming that it represented, "many streams of opinion and many points of view". Dole exclaimed, "if there’s anyone who has mistakenly attached themselves to our party in the belief that we are not open to citizens of every race and religion, then let me remind you — tonight this hall belongs to the party of Lincoln, and the exits, which are clearly marked, are for you to walk out of as I stand this ground without compromise."

In comments that were seen as partially alluding to his longevity of age; Dole who at the age of 74, was older than any previous United States president had been when elected to their first term, hailed himself as prospectively being, "the bridge to a time of tranquility, faith and confidence in action," exclaiming, "to those who say it was never so, that America had not been better, I say, you're wrong, and I know. Because I was there. I have seen it. I remember."

Dole touted the value of political compromise, proclaiming, "in politics, honorable compromise is no sin. It is what protects us from absolutism and intolerance."

Dole characterized his Democratic opponent, incumbent president Bill Clinton, as having failed to, "provide for our future defense" in regards to defense spending.

Dole issued negative characterizations of a varied array of groups and elements, including attacks on teachers unions, liberal judges, criminals, and government bureaucracies. Dole negatively characterized the book It Takes a Village (which was written by  First Lady Hillary Clinton, the wife of Dole's Democratic opponent Bill Clinton), as calling for state collectivist childcare, which he argued ran counter to the concept of family responsibility.

Dole's speech was written over a period of several months. However, days before he was scheduled to deliver it, four aides of Dole were brought in to overhaul the speech's conclusion.

The Houston Chronicle reviewed Dole's speech as making, " his strongest case yet," for why he should become president' The New York Times editorial board gave the speech a mixed review, describing it as illustrating, "both the strengths and the weaknesses" of Dole's candidacy. It took issue on Dole's criticism of Clinton's defense spending as insufficient, arguing that with his proposed 15% across-the-board tax cut, Dole was, "in no position to declare that he will spend more" on defense spending. John Marelius of the San Diego Union-Tribune characterized the speech as lacking either, "soaringly memorable language or a thematic spine." However, he also opined that, by highlighting the issue of mutual trust government and the public, Dole articulated, "a rationale for his candidacy that had so often been missing on the campaign trail." The Chicago Tribune's editorial board, in its endorsement of Dole, hailed Dole's "eloquent" remarks against religious and racial intolerance.

Jack Kemp's vice presidential nomination acceptance speech 
Jack Kemp, the former Secretary of Housing and Urban Development under the George H. W. Bush Administration, gave his acceptance speech as the 1996 Republican vice presidential nominee. He would give his acceptance speech as the nominee, right before Bob Dole gave his acceptance speech for the Republican Presidential Nomination.

Elizabeth Dole 
Presidential nominee Bob Dole's wife, Elizabeth, spoke at the convention. In tandem with his Democratic opponent Bill Clinton's wife, Hillary Clinton, later speaking at the Democratic convention, 1996 became the year in which it became established practice that both major party candidates spouses speak at their party's convention.

Susan Molinari's keynote address
U.S. House of Representatives and Vice Chair of the House Republican Conference, Susan Molinari, spoke at the convention, Molinari was elected vice chair of the Republican Conference in 1994. In 1996, party leaders chose Molinari to deliver the keynote address.

George H. W. Bush

Former president George H. W. Bush, who been unseated in the previous 1992 election, delivered a speech on the convention's opening night.

Gerald Ford

Former president Gerald Ford, who had selected Dole as his vice presidential running mate in the 1976 United States presidential election, delivered a short speech on the convention's opening night.

Ford, in light of the Republican ticket trailing by double-digits in the polls at the time of the 1996 Republican National Convention, reminded voters that the 1976 Ford-Dole ticket gained 30 points in the polls before November 1976.

In his remarks, Ford made an automobile pun, quipping, "a few years ago, when I suddenly found myself President, I said I was a Ford, not a Lincoln. Today, what we have in the White House is neither a Ford or a Lincoln. What we have is a convertible Dodge. Isn't it time for a trade-in?".

Colin Powell

Retired general Colin Powell delivered a speech on the convention's opening night. This was Powell's first major partisan political speech. Powell had only formally joined the Republican Party the previous year. Powell's speech was largely a call for compassion and inclusion, and touched on his upbringing by parents who were black immigrants from Jamaica. In endorsing Dole, Powell did not directly attack the Democratic ticket.

Nancy Reagan

The wife of former president Ronald Reagan, Nancy Reagan, spoke at the convention, expressing gratitude.

Stephen Fong
On the closing night of the convention, Stephen Fong, then-president of the San Francisco chapter of the Log Cabin Republicans, spoke at the dais as part of a series of speeches from "mainstreet Americans," but was not publicly identified as gay. Fong was the first openly gay speaker at a Republican National Convention.

Pat Buchannan
White House Communications Director and Political Commentator, Pat Buchanan, was denied to give a speech, though he still planned to attend it.

Presidential nomination
Senator John McCain placed Bob Dole's name in nomination

Vice Presidential tally
New York Governor George Pataki placed Jack Kemp's name into nomination, after which the former Secretary of Housing and Urban Development
was nominated by voice vote.

Impact
On August 16, the day after the close convention, John Marelius of the San Diego Union-Tribune characterized different polls as showing conflicting indicators as to whether Dole was rising or declining in the polls.

Ever since the 1996 election, which both the Democratic and Republican conventions featuring the spouses of the presidential nominees as speakers, it has become standard practice that both major parties feature the spouses of their presidential nominees as convention speakers.

See also
1996 Republican Party presidential primaries
History of the United States Republican Party
List of Republican National Conventions
U.S. presidential nomination convention
1996 Democratic National Convention
1996 Libertarian National Convention
1996 United States presidential election
Bob Dole 1996 presidential campaign

References

External links
 Bob Dole's nomination acceptance speech for President at RNC (transcript) at The American Presidency Project
 Republican Party platform of 1996 at The American Presidency Project
PBS Online NewsHour: Convention: The GOP in San Diego, archive including transcripts, analysis, photographs, and streaming audio.
CNN AllPolitics: 1996 Republican National Convention, archived fact, news, chat and speech transcripts, and links
EmergencyNet News Service: GOP National Convention Security Plan, August 10, 1996
Video of Dole nomination acceptance speech for President at RNC (via YouTube)
Audio of Dole nomination acceptance speech for President at RNC
Video of Kemp nomination acceptance speech for Vice President at RNC (via YouTube)
Audio of Kemp nomination acceptance speech for Vice President at RNC
Transcript of Kemp nomination acceptance speech for Vice President at RNC  
Video (with full audio) of Susan Molinari's Keynote Address at Republican National Convention
Text of Susan Molinari's Keynote Address at Republican National Convention

Republican National Conventions
Republican National Convention
1996 Republican National Convention, 1996
Republican National Convention
Republican Party (United States) events in California
1996 conferences
August 1996 events in the United States
Bob Dole
Jack Kemp